Miriam College is a non-stock, non-profit Filipino Catholic educational institution for girls and young women in Quezon City, Philippines.

It offers academic programs from pre-elementary to post-graduate and adult education levels that develop the learning and caring competencies of students and are enriched by a wide range of national, regional, and international linkages. Although primarily a women’s school, its pre-elementary, graduate, adult education, and deaf education programs accept male students.

History

The history of Miriam College dates back to 1926 when Archbishop of Manila Michael J. O'Doherty requested the Maryknoll Sisters of St. Dominic of Ossning, New York to initiate a teacher-training program for women in the Philippines. In an old remodeled Augustinian convent in Malabon, the Malabon Normal School was established. The school moved several times until 1953, when was officially renamed to Maryknoll College, and permanently settled on the eastern edge of Diliman (now Loyola Heights) in Quezon City.

After the Second Vatican Council, the Maryknoll congregation began to evaluate its work in the light of their original apostolate as a missionary order. In the 1960s, the Maryknoll congregation saw the readiness of the Filipino laity to continue the education mission they had started. In 1977, the ownership and management of the school was turned over to lay administrators. In accordance with the agreement, the name Maryknoll was to be changed to pave the way for the promotion of the school’s unique identity, distinct although not disconnected from the identity of the Maryknoll sisters. In 1989, after a series of consultations, Maryknoll College was renamed Miriam College.

Miriam College stopped accepting male students at the collegiate level in 1999. The last batch of male students, who had entered the college in 1998, graduated in 2002, thereby making Miriam College an exclusive all-women's college. However, the preschool, adult education, graduate school, and deaf-mute education departments remain as co-educational and are still open to males.

Presidents 
The first lay president and first female president of a Catholic college in the Philippines was Dr. Paz V. Adriano, who had been a student of the Maryknoll nuns. The second president was Dr. Lourdes Quisumbing, who later became the Secretary of Education under Corazon Aquino, the 11th president of the Philippines. The third was Dr. Loreta Castro; the fourth was Dr. Patricia B. Licuanan, who is currently the chairperson of the Commission on Higher Education. Dr. Rosario Oreta Lapus later served as president from 2010 to 2019. The current president is Ambassador Laura Quiambao-del Rosario, former Department of Foreign Affairs undersecretary and diplomat.

Campus facilities

Campus facilities include a modern, four-story LEAD Residence Hall for college students and guests, the Gallery of Women's Art featuring donated works from women artists, the Marian Auditorium for institutional events, the Little Theater for smaller events, the Mini-Forest Park, a chapel, Stations of the Cross, Library Media Center, and the Child Development and Day Care Center.

Miriam College Nuvali
Miriam College's satellite Nuvali campus was opened in 2014. A coeducational campus, it is located along Diversity Avenue corner Evoliving Parkway, Nuvali, Calamba, Laguna.

Notable alumni
 Roxanne Barcelo - actress, singer, children's show host
 Iza Calzado - actress
 Nieves Confesor - dean of the Asian Institute of Management; former Secretary of Labor and Employment
 Nikki Coseteng - former senator
 Gaby Dela Merced - Formula Three race car driver, actress
 Andi Eigenmann - actress
 Coney Reyes - actress, host
 Tina Paner - singer, entrepreneur
 Juris Fernandez - former vocalist for MYMP's
 Nina Girado - pop and R&B singer, songwriter, record producer, commercial model, television and radio personality
 Alodia Gosiengfiao - model, presenter, cosplayer, recording artist, and online streamer
 Chin Chin Gutierrez - former actress, environmentalist
 Pauleen Luna - actress, model, wife of Vic Sotto
 Maxene Magalona - actress, model,
 Andrea Manzano (aka Andi 9, Andi Manzano) - MTV VJ, DJ, print ad model
 Margie Moran - Miss Universe 1973, socialite, granddaughter of Former President Manuel Roxas
 Dianne Medina - actress, dancer, television host, anchor and part-time model
 Korina Sanchez - broadcast journalist for ABS-CBN
 Leah Navarro - singer
 Karla Santos (aka Karel Marquez) - actress, former MYX VJ
 Maria Rosario "Chat" Silayan-Bailon - actress, Miss Universe 1980 Third Runner-Up
 Jannelle So - sports commentator
 Donya Tesoro - Mayor of San Manuel, Tarlac
 Marissa Camurungan - actress, singer and host. wife of actor Ronnie Ricketts
 Julia Barretto - actress
 Jane Oineza - actress
 Dennis Trillo - actor, singer
 Diana Zubiri - actress
 Hilda Koronel - actress
 Celeste Legaspi - artist, producer
 Lovi Poe - actress, singer, daughter of Fernando Poe Jr.

References

External links 
 

Catholic universities and colleges in Metro Manila
Catholic elementary schools in Metro Manila
Catholic secondary schools in Metro Manila
Girls' schools in the Philippines
Women's universities and colleges in the Philippines
Liberal arts colleges in the Philippines
Schools for the deaf in the Philippines
Association of Christian Universities and Colleges in Asia
Educational institutions established in 1926
1926 establishments in the Philippines
Universities and colleges in Laguna (province)
Schools in Laguna (province)
Education in Calamba, Laguna
Universities and colleges in Quezon City
Alliance of Girls' Schools Australasia